Pavel Dovgulevets (: born 26 December 1977) is a Belarusian former footballer.

Dovgulevets previously played for Dinamo Minsk (1997–2000), Darida Minsk Raion (2000–2005), Dinamo Brest (2006–2007) and Torpedo Zhodino (2007–2008) in the Belarusian Premier League and Kryvbas Kryvyi Rih in the Ukrainian Premier League (2005–2006).

Honours
Dinamo Minsk
Belarusian Premier League champion: 1997

Dinamo Brest
Belarusian Cup winner: 2006–07

References

External links

Profile at teams.by

1977 births
Living people
Belarusian footballers
Association football defenders
Belarusian expatriate footballers
Expatriate footballers in Ukraine
FC Dinamo Minsk players
FC Darida Minsk Raion players
FC Kryvbas Kryvyi Rih players
FC Dynamo Brest players
FC Torpedo-BelAZ Zhodino players
FC Gorodeya players